Laura Barquero Jiménez (born 12 October 2001) is a Spanish pair skater. With her skating partner, Marco Zandron, she is the 2021 CS Nebelhorn Trophy silver medalist and the 2021 Spanish national champion.

With her former skating partner, Tòn Cónsul, she is the 2020 Spanish national champion and competed in the final segment at the 2020 European Championships. With her former skating partner, Aritz Maestu, she is the 2018 Toruń Cup champion and 2018 International Challenge Cup champion and competed for Spain at two World Championships.

Career

Early years 
Barquero began learning to skate in 2009. As a single skater, she trained under Marta Senra and Ainhoa Gimeno in Madrid, Spain. She competed on the junior level. She received one ISU Junior Grand Prix assignment in September 2016.

Barquero's first pair skating partner was Miguel Taranco. They made no international appearances together.

2016–2017 season 
Barquero and Aritz Maestu announced their partnership on 4 January 2017. They decided to train in Bergamo, Italy, coached by Barbara Luoni and Franca Bianconi. During their first season together, the pair was ineligible for international competitions due to the ISU's age requirements – Barquero was too young for senior events and Maestu too old for juniors.

2017–2018 season 
Making their international debut, Barquero/Maestu placed seventh at the 2017 CS Lombardia Trophy in mid-September. At the end of the month, they placed thirteenth at the 2017 CS Nebelhorn Trophy, the final qualifying opportunity for the 2018 Winter Olympics. Although their placement was not sufficient to qualify, Spain became the third alternate for a spot in the Olympic pairs' event.

In January, Barquero/Maestu placed eleventh at the 2018 European Championships in Moscow, Russia. The following month, they won gold at the Toruń Cup in Toruń, Poland, and at the International Challenge Cup in The Hague, Netherlands.  They concluded the season at the 2018 World Championships, in twentieth place.

2018–2019 season 
Barquero/Maestu began the season with two Challenger assignments, finishing fifth at the 2018 CS Lombardia Trophy and eighth at the 2018 CS Finlandia Trophy.  Making their Grand Prix debut with two assignments, they were seventh at the 2018 Grand Prix of Helsinki and sixth at 2018 NHK Trophy.  They were seventh at the 2019 European Championships after taking their second consecutive national title.  Their final event together was the 2019 World Championships, where they placed fifteenth.

On May 31, 2019, it was announced that Maestu had suffered an injury that would involve a prolonged recovery, and as a consequence of this, the team split.

2019–2020 season
In July 2019, Barquero teamed up with Tòn Cónsul.

The team made their international debut at the Denis Ten Memorial Challenge, where they won the silver medal. They continued their season at the IceLab International Cup, where they won bronze. They were fourth at the 2019 CS Warsaw Cup. Their last competition before Nationals was the 2019 CS Golden Spin of Zagreb, where they were eighth. At their first Spanish Nationals, they won their first National title.

They competed at the 2020 European Championships, where they placed fourteenth. They went on to compete at the International Challenge Cup, where they placed ninth. They were named to the team for the 2020 Worlds, but the competition was cancelled due to the COVID-19 pandemic.

On 26 June 2020, it was announced that the pair had split after only one season together.

2020–2021 season
Barquero formed a new partnership with Italian pairs skater Marco Zandron, and in January 2021, they were formally cleared to represent Spain. They won the Spanish national title in their first outing together but did not compete internationally during the season.

2021–2022 season
Barquero/Zandron made their international debut on the Challenger series at the 2021 Lombardia Trophy. They were second in the short program and won the free skate, taking the silver medal overall and finishing less than four points behind Italian national champions Della Monica/Guarise. They were next assigned to the 2021 CS Nebelhorn Trophy, attempting to qualify a berth for Spain at the 2022 Winter Olympics.  Third in the short program, they won the free skate despite two jump errors, taking the silver medal overall and the first of three pairs berths available at the event. This was the first time a Spanish pair qualified for the Winter Olympics. Barquero said she was "proud" of their work, while Zandron said he was confident that he would acquire Spanish citizenship in time to attend the Games. At their second Challenger, the 2021 CS Finlandia Trophy, they placed sixth with new personal bests in both segments and overall.

Zandron obtained his Spanish citizenship on December 29, 2021, making the team eligible to represent Spain at the Winter Olympics. In the new year, they competed together at their first European Championships, finishing in ninth place. Competing at the 2022 Winter Olympics in the pairs event, Barquero/Zandron were eleventh in the short program, receiving only a base level on their death spiral. Eleventh in the free skate as well; they finished eleventh overall.

On 22 February, the International Testing Agency reported that a sample taken from Barquero following the short program at the Olympics tested positive for a banned substance, a Clostebol metabolite. Her team suggested that the most likely source of the substance was the Trofodermin that she applied to a cut between her fingers caused by her skate blades during the short program. Due to Barquero's pending anti-doping case, Barquero/Zandron consequently were not entered for the 2022 World Championships scheduled for the end of March.

Programs

Pairs with Zandron

Pairs with Cónsul

Pairs with Maestu

Ladies' singles

Competitive highlights 
GP: Grand Prix; CS: Challenger Series; JGP: Junior Grand Prix

Pairs

With Zandron

With Cónsul

With Maestu

Ladies' singles

Detailed results 
Small medals for short and free programs awarded only at ISU Championships.

With Zandron

With Cónsul

With Maestu

References

External links 

 
 
 
 

2001 births
Living people
Spanish female pair skaters
Sportspeople from Madrid
Figure skaters at the 2022 Winter Olympics
Olympic figure skaters of Spain